Rachel is a sculpture by Michelangelo of the Old Testament figure Rachel. Like Leah, it was part of the final, 1542–1545 design for the tomb of Pope Julius II in San Pietro in Vincoli, on which it still remains.

See also 
 List of works by Michelangelo

Bibliography
  Umberto Baldini, Michelangelo scultore, Rizzoli, Milano 1973.
  Marta Alvarez Gonzáles, Michelangelo, Mondadori Arte, Milano 2007.

External links

Tomb of Pope Julius II
Sculptures by Michelangelo
Marble sculptures in Italy
16th-century sculptures
Sculptures depicting Hebrew Bible people
Sculptures of women in Italy